Clancier is a French surname. Notable people with the surname include:

Agnès Clancier (born 1963), French writer
Georges-Emmanuel Clancier (1914–2018), French poet, novelist, and journalist

French-language surnames